Hisaji Hara is a Japanese photographer.

Biography
Hisaji Hara was born in Tokyo in 1964 and graduated from Musashino Art University in 1986. He emigrated to the United States in 1993, working as a film director. He returned to Japan in 2001.

Influences
Hara has explicitly named Russian director Andrei Tarkovsky as a prominent influence in his work.

Technique
Hara primarily works with purposefully aged black-and-white photographs; in order to create photos that "enjoy the diversity of time." 
Hara is primarily known for his series of photographic Balthus studies.

Exhibitions
 Picture, Photography and Beyond (September 3 – October 2, 2011)

References

Japanese photographers
1964 births
Living people